Maculabatis ambigua, Baraka's whipray, is a species of stingray in the family Dasyatidae.
It is found in the Western Indian Ocean: from the Red Sea south to Tanzania and the island of Zanzibar.

References

ambigua
Taxa named by Peter R. Last
Taxa named by Sergey V. Bogorodsky
Taxa named by Tilman J. Alpermann
Fish described in 2016